This is a list of NCAA Division I Football Bowl Subdivision alignment history. Teams in italics are no longer in the Football Bowl Subdivision. Teams in bold italics have announced transitions to FBS. The most recent program to complete an FBS transition is Liberty, which began its transition in 2017 and became a full FBS member in 2019. The most recent school to leave the FBS ranks is Idaho, which downgraded its program to FCS (the Football Championship Subdivision) after the 2017 season.

Notably, Idaho is the only program to voluntarily downgrade from FBS to FCS without extenuating circumstances since the NCAA created those subdivisions in 1978. After the 1981 season, a large number of programs were downgraded from Division I-A (now FBS) to Division I-AA (now FCS) by the NCAA. Two teams that met NCAA requirements to remain in I-A at that time, McNeese and Yale, chose to voluntarily downgrade to align with the rest of their conferences. Most never returned to I-A/FBS, with the most significant exceptions being Cincinnati and most members of the Mid-American Conference, which were reinstated into I-A after only a single season at the I-AA level.

Listings are accurate for the coming 2023 college football season.

A
Air Force 1957–present
Akron 1987–present
Alabama 1937–1940, 1946–present
Alcorn State 1977
Appalachian State 1974–1981, 2014–present
Arizona 1939–1940, 1946–present
Arizona State 1946–1948, 1950–1954, 1956–present
Arkansas 1937–1940, 1946–present
Arkansas State 1975–1981, 1992–present
Army 1937–1940, 1946–present
Auburn 1937–1940, 1946–present

B
Ball State 1975–81, 1983–present
Baylor 1937–1940, 1946–present
Boise State 1996–present
Boston College 1939–1940, 1946–present
Boston University 1939–1940, 1947–1965
Bowling Green 1961–81, 1983–present
Brown 1937–1940, 1946–1981
Bucknell 1938–1940, 1946–1947
Buffalo 1962–1970, 1999–present
BYU 1938–1940, 1946–present

C
California 1937–1940, 1946–present
Cal State Fullerton 1976–1992
Carnegie Tech 1937–1940
Case Western Reserve 1948
Centenary 1938–1947
Central Michigan 1975–present
Charlotte 2015–present
Chattanooga 1946–1948, 1950, 1977–1981
Chicago 1937–1939
Cincinnati 1946, 1948–1981, 1983–present
Citadel 1939, 1946–1952, 1959–1981
Clemson 1937–1940, 1946–present
Coastal Carolina 2017–present
Colgate 1937–1940, 1946–1981
Colorado 1937–1940, 1946–present
Colorado College 1946–1947
Colorado State 1940, 1946–present
Columbia 1938–1940, 1946–1981
Cornell 1937–1940, 1946–1981
Creighton 1939–1942

D
Dartmouth 1937–1940, 1946–1981
Davidson 1937–1940, 1946–1953, 1967–1976
Dayton 1956–1976
Denver 1940–1960
Detroit 1939–1964
Drake 1939–1940, 1946–1958, 1973–1980
Duke 1937–1940, 1946–present
Duquesne 1937–1940, 1947–1950

E
East Carolina 1966–present
East Tennessee State 1978–1981
Eastern Michigan 1976–81, 1983–present

F
FIU 2006–present
Florida 1937–1940, 1946–present
Florida Atlantic 2006–present
Florida State 1955–present
Fordham 1937–1940, 1946–1954
Fresno State 1973–present
Furman 1946–1953, 1955–1957, 1965, 1973–1981

G
Georgetown 1937–1940, 1946–1950
George Washington 1939–1966
Georgia 1937–1940, 1946–present
Georgia Southern 2014–present
Georgia State 2013–present
Georgia Tech 1937–1940, 1946–present
Gonzaga 1938–1941
Grambling 1977

H
Hardin–Simmons 1946–1948, 1950–1962
Harvard 1937–1940, 1946–1981
Haskell 1937–1938
Hawaii 1974–present
Holy Cross 1938–1940, 1946–1981
Houston 1949–present

I
Idaho 1938–1940, 1946–1967, 1969–1977, 1997–2017
Illinois 1937–1940, 1946–present
Illinois State 1976–1981
Indiana 1937–1940, 1946–present
Indiana State 1976–1981
Iowa 1937–1940, 1946–present
Iowa State 1937–1940, 1946–present

J
Jackson State 1977
Jacksonville State 2023–future
James Madison 2022–present

K
Kansas 1937–1940, 1946–present
Kansas State 1937–1940, 1946–present
Kennesaw State 2024–future
Kent State 1962–1981, 1983–present
Kentucky 1937, 1940–present

L
Lafayette 1938–1940, 1946–1950
Lamar 1974–1981
Lehigh 1938–1940, 1946–1947
Liberty 2018–present
Long Beach State 1973–1991
Louisiana 1974–present
Louisiana–Monroe 1975–1981, 1994–present
Louisiana Tech 1975–1981, 1989–present
Louisville 1951, 1962–present
Loyola Marymount 1950–1951
Loyola (Chicago) 1940
LSU 1937–1940, 1946–present

M
Manhattan 1937–1942
Marquette 1937–1960
Marshall 1962–1981, 1998–present
Maryland 1937, 1940, 1946–present
Massachusetts 2012–present
McNeese State 1975–1981
Memphis 1960–present
Merchant Marine 1946–1947
Miami (FL) 1946–present
Miami (OH) 1948–1949, 1961–1981, 1983–present
Michigan 1937–1940, 1946–present
Michigan State 1937–1940, 1946–present
Middle Tennessee 1999–present
Minnesota 1937–1940, 1946–present
Mississippi State 1937–1940, 1946–present
Missouri 1937–1940, 1946–present
Montana 1939–1940, 1946–1962
Montana State 1946–1948

N
Navy 1937–1940, 1946–present
Nebraska 1937–1940, 1946–present
Nevada 1946–1950, 1992–present
New Hampshire 1940
New Mexico 1940, 1946–present
New Mexico State 1946–1947, 1952–1953, 1959–present
North Carolina 1937–1940, 1946–present
North Carolina State 1940, 1946–present
North Texas 1957–1981, 1995–present
Northern Arizona 1946–1947
Northern Colorado 1946–1947
Northern Illinois 1969–1981, 1983–present
Northwestern 1937–1940, 1946–present
Northwestern State 1976–1977
Notre Dame 1937–1940, 1946–present
NYU 1937–1948, 1951–1952

O
Ohio 1948, 1961–1981, 1983–present
Ohio State 1937–1940, 1946–present
Oklahoma 1937–1940, 1946–present
Oklahoma State 1939–1940, 1946–present
Old Dominion 2014–present
Ole Miss 1937–1940, 1946–present
Oregon 1937–1940, 1946–present
Oregon State 1937–1940, 1946–present

P
Pacific 1950–1960, 1962–1963, 1966, 1969–1995
Penn 1937–1940, 1946–1981
Penn State 1938–1940, 1946–present
Pittsburgh 1937–1940, 1946–present
Portland 1946–1948
Princeton 1937–1940, 1946–1981
Purdue 1937–1940, 1946–present

R
Rice 1937–1940, 1946–present
Richmond 1940, 1946–1981
Rutgers 1946–present

S
Saint Louis 1940–1949
Saint Mary's 1937–1940, 1946–1950
Sam Houston 2023–future
San Diego State 1969–present
San Francisco 1940–1951
San Jose State 1939–1940, 1950–present
Santa Clara 1937–1942, 1946–1952
Sewanee 1937
South Alabama 2012–present
South Carolina 1939–1940, 1946–present
South Florida 2001–present
Southern California 1937–1940, 1946–present
Southern Illinois 1973–1981
SMU 1937–1940, 1946–1986, 1989–present
Southern Miss 1960, 1963–present
Southern U. 1977
Stanford 1937–1940, 1946–present
Syracuse 1937–1940, 1946–present

T
Tampa 1973–1974
TCU 1937–1940, 1946–present
Temple 1938–1940, 1946–1953, 1971–present
Tennessee 1937–1940, 1946–present
Tennessee State 1977–1980
Texas 1937–1940, 1946–present
Texas–Arlington 1972–1981
Texas A&M 1937–1940, 1946–present
Texas Southern 1977
Texas State 2012–present
Texas Tech 1937–1940, 1946–present
Toledo 1962–present
Trinity (TX) 1960
Troy 2002–present
Tulane 1937–1940, 1946–present
Tulsa 1937–1940, 1946–present

U
 UAB 1996–2014, 2017–present
 UCF 1996–present
 UCLA 1937–1940, 1946–present
 UConn 2002–present
 UNLV 1978–present
 Utah 1938–1940, 1946–present
 Utah State 1939–1940, 1946–present
 UTEP 1940, 1946–present
 UTSA 2012–present

V
Vanderbilt 1937–1940, 1946–present
Villanova 1939–1940, 1946–1980
Virginia 1940, 1946–present
Virginia Tech 1940, 1946–present
VMI 1939–40, 1946–81

W
Wake Forest 1939–1940, 1946–present
Washington 1937–1940, 1946–present
Washington (MO) 1937–1940
Washington & Lee 1940, 1946–1953
Washington State 1937–1940, 1946–present
West Texas A&M 1946–1947, 1951–1953, 1958–1980 (as West Texas State)
West Virginia 1939–1940, 1946–present
Western Carolina 1977–1981
Western Kentucky 2008–present
Western Michigan 1962–present
Wichita State 1946–1986
William & Mary 1940, 1946–1981
Wisconsin 1937–1940, 1946–present
Wyoming 1940, 1946–present

X
Xavier 1960–1973

Y
Yale 1937–1940, 1946–1981

See also
NCAA Men's Division I Basketball alignment history
NCAA Division I Football Championship Subdivision alignment history

Footnotes

References 

College football-related lists
FBS
NCAA Division I FBS football